The International Institute of Human Rights (French: Institut international des droits de l'homme, IIDH) is an association under French local law based in Strasbourg, France. It includes approximately 300 members (individual and collective) worldwide, including universities, researchers, and practitioners of human rights.

The IIDH was founded by René Cassin, who won the Nobel Peace Prize in 1968. Cassin donated the prize money for the creation of an international institute of human rights in Strasbourg. The current president is Jean-Paul Costa since 2011.

IIHR is a recognized partner of the United Nations and has consultative status with the United Nations Economic and Social Council (ECOSOC) and UNESCO. It also collaborates with other international and regional organizations, including the Council of Europe, the Organization for Security and Cooperation in Europe (OSCE), and the African Union.

See also
 Universal Declaration of Human Rights
 European Convention on Human Rights
 European Court of Human Rights
 International human rights law
 Three generations of human rights
 CCJO René Cassin
 European Institutions in Strasbourg

External links
International Institute of Human Rights

Human rights organizations based in France
International human rights organizations
Organizations based in Strasbourg